Phineas and Ferb the Movie: Candace Against the Universe (announced as The Phineas and Ferb Movie) is a 2020 American animated film produced by Disney Television Animation. Co-written and directed by Bob Bowen, the film is based on the Disney Channel and Disney XD animated television series Phineas and Ferb created by Dan Povenmire and Jeff "Swampy" Marsh, the second feature-length film of the Phineas and Ferb series, and a standalone sequel to Phineas and Ferb the Movie: Across the 2nd Dimension (2011). Set at some point during the summer depicted in the series and before the series finale, the film focuses on Phineas Flynn and Ferb Fletcher as they rescue their sister Candace Flynn and Doofenshmirtz's daughter Vanessa Doofenshmirtz from the planet Feebla-Oot. However, Candace becomes tempted to stay on the planet when she is treated with respect by its people, not knowing that they harbor a dark secret which involves her presence.

While developing Disney+, Disney approached Povenmire and Marsh for a new Phineas and Ferb film. The film began work at Disney Television Animation, but was continued remotely from home due to the COVID-19 pandemic. The entire Phineas and Ferb cast reprise their roles from the series and the previous film, with the exception of Thomas Brodie-Sangster, the original voice of Ferb, who is replaced by David Errigo Jr.; much of the film's dialogue was recorded remotely. Danny Jacob returned to compose the score as with the series and the previous film; as with the voice acting, music was recorded remotely.

Phineas and Ferb The Movie: Candace Against the Universe was heavily promoted in marketing campaigns by Disney and was heavily anticipated by fans of the series. It was released on Disney+ on August 28, 2020. The film received positive reviews from critics, and holds a  approval rating on Rotten Tomatoes, being praised for its story, voice acting, animation, and music. A potential third film is being considered.

The movie will make its linear premiere on Disney Channel in the United States on April 8, 2023.

Plot 
Candace Flynn's day of optimism is ruined when she fails to tell her mother about the antics of her brothers Phineas Flynn and Ferb Fletcher, who spend their time making crazy inventions. Candace airs her grievances to her friend Vanessa Doofenshmirtz, and as they talk, a space pod appears and kidnaps them. Phineas and Ferb identify the license plate on the pod and learn that it came from the planet Feebla-Oot in the Vroblok Cluster. With this knowledge, they recruit their friends Isabella Garcia-Shapiro, Baljeet Tjinder, and Buford van Stomm to help them build a portal to the planet. However, the portal redirects them to Doofenshmirtz Evil Inc., where they join forces with Dr. Heinz Doofenshmirtz. Anticipating that the portal would not work, Doofenshmirtz had built a spaceship – which he dubs a "Galactic Travel Inator". He and the children travel to Feebla-Oot, with Perry the Platypus secretly following them.

Candace and Vanessa explore the spaceship they have been taken to and locate the escape pods. While Vanessa escapes, Candace is captured; both end up on Feebla-Oot. Candace is taken to the leader, Super Super Big Doctor, who sympathizes with her plight. She, too, has two younger brothers that she was tired of and decided to come to Feebla-Oot to rule it. Big Doctor informs Candace that she contains "Remarkalonium", which is important for their people, thus making Candace feel special. Upon arriving to Feebla-Oot, Phineas and Ferb try to patch things up with their sister by giving her a gift they made, but she rejects them and Big Doctor has them taken away.

The gang become imprisoned, which is what Big Doctor had done to her brothers; Perry rescues them. Candace learns that the "Remarkalonium" is actually just carbon dioxide, which is what a spore plant named Mama needs so that Big Doctor can use its mind controlling spores on her subjects. Candace accidentally reveals that the people of Earth exhale carbon dioxide. With this knowledge, Big Doctor plots to conquer the planet. Phineas, Ferb and the gang team up with the oppressed Cowards, the previous inhabitants, and attack the alien city. As they begin the battle, Big Doctor and her army flee to Earth. The gang follow her, but Doofenshmirtz and Perry stay behind when they learn that Vanessa is still on Feebla-Oot.

The gang return to Earth in time to fight Big Doctor and her army. While Isabella, Buford, and Baljeet lead a battle against the aliens, Phineas and Ferb free Candace, who they find crying in shame over how she treated her brothers. They reveal that her gift is a coffee mug that projects images of their past adventures. Candace realizes that she may not be special to the world, but she is special to them. They begin fighting the aliens, but Mama grows big enough to unleash her spores on the populace. As the heroes are captured, Candace manages to reach out to Big Doctor, who has an epiphany about her life, just as Mama increases in size and devours her.

As the kids and Mama begin to fight, Doofenshmirtz, Vanessa, and Perry suddenly return, having used the Chicken-Replace Inator, a gadget that swaps something with the closest or furthest chicken, to transport themselves to Earth. Under Doofenshmirtz's direction, Candace uses the Inator on Mama, replacing it with the chicken used to reach Danville, and sends it back to Feebla-Oot. Mama shrinks in size and spits out Big Doctor, while getting crushed to death by an alien elephant lookalike from earlier. Big Doctor gets captured and taken into custody by the Cowards. Candace has the chance to bust her brothers when Linda Flynn-Fletcher, her mother, drives by, but she instead tells her to go get pizza for them away from the scene. Candace begins to truly appreciate her brothers for everything they have done for her, while a wandering Perry receives a call from Major Monogram congratulating him, forcing the platypus to hide the message, which leaves everyone in confusion.

Voice cast

Production

Development 
While developing their new streaming service, Disney+, Disney approached Phineas and Ferb creators Dan Povenmire and Jeff "Swampy" Marsh and asked them to develop a new Phineas and Ferb film for the service, as they wanted the service to have "projects that would appeal both to kids and adults", stating that the "show has a multi-generational appeal", with 47% of their audience being adults. Although initially unsure about making a film, as they "thought [they] had done enough with these characters", the two eventually agreed to develop the film upon realizing they "kind of missed them", to which they "started thinking about a fun premise that would appeal to everyone, even those who weren't familiar with the show".

On April 11, 2019, it was announced that a new film titled The Phineas and Ferb Movie would be executive produced by Povenmire and Marsh, and be released on Disney+ within a year of its launch; according to Jim Bernstein, it is unrelated to a theatrical Phineas and Ferb film that was previously in the works. Like the series, the film is produced by Disney Television Animation, marking their first non-television film since Teacher's Pet (2004). The film also marks Disney's first non-television film to use 2D animation since Walt Disney Animation Studios' Winnie the Pooh (2011). The film's title was announced as Phineas and Ferb The Movie: Candace Against the Universe on August 23, 2019, during the 2019 D23 Expo. On March 27, 2020, Disney Television Animation was temporarily closed in response to the COVID-19 pandemic, but production on the film continued remotely. On July 1, 2020, it was revealed that Bob Bowen would direct the film. The film officially wrapped production on July 11, 2020.

Writing 
During the first three weeks of writing, the writers came up with several different ideas for the film, but they were all discarded, as they had already been done in the series. They eventually came up with the idea of "a real rescue story" in which Candace is captured by aliens, and settled on that, as the series never had a rescue story, a story in which Candace was the main character, or a story that put the characters in "dire stakes". Povenmire and Marsh choose to make Candace the film's main character because they felt "it was about time" to focus on Candace. Povenmire and Marsh said that they "wanted to make sure [they] had something new to say" about the characters while working on the film, but that didn't "violate any of the characters' set-ups and rules of their world". Another story was considered for the film, but was discarded, as the creators felt it was "not a good way of introducing [the universe] to a new generation, which is what [they wanted] this movie to be", as it was "much more geared towards fans who'd seen every episode, or at least [are] super familiar with how these characters work. It sort of turned all that upside down, turned it on its head". Povenmire revealed that the writers first wrote a script before starting to storyboard the film, a process contrary to the TV series, which was written during the storyboard process.

Povenmire described creating the film's opening as "a tricky thing", as they wanted to depict "what a typical day was like for Phineas and Ferb and Candace", so audiences unfamiliar with the series could enjoy the film, "[s]o [they] showed Candace trying to bust them and never having been able to do it, how crazy she can get, and show a bust that doesn't work at the very beginning of the movie". During the film's appearance at Comic-Con@Home, Povenmire revealed that three different opening scenes for the film were created during its development, but they were all discarded, as they all depicted Candace in a negative light when the filmmakers "wanted people to be on her side".

At the same event, Marsh revealed that Bowen managed to find a "creative solution" to a story issue within the film, which he and Povenmire initially opposed, but eventually agreed to use in the film after he pitched it to them again as an animatic; Joshua Pruett later revealed that this is the idea of using a T-shirt cannon. One of the jokes in the film, featuring Phineas, Ferb, Isabella, Baljeet, and Buford going "back to their base elements" before transitioning to a live-action scene where Povenmire and Marsh are seen pitching the scene, was originally written by Jon Colton Barry for the unproduced theatrical film. The joke was re-purposed for this film due to it being Povenmire's favorite joke from the script. When they choose to re-use the gag, Povenmire and Barry spent at least two days looking for the unproduced film's draft that contained the scene in order to re-use the dialogue featured in that scene. Disney executives originally ordered the gag to be removed from the film, but Povenmire and Marsh refused, feeling that audiences would react to it positively.

Casting and recording 
During the film's announcement, it was confirmed that Vincent Martella, Ashley Tisdale, Caroline Rhea, Dee Bradley Baker, Alyson Stoner, Maulik Pancholy, Bobby Gaylor, Olivia Olson, Tyler Mann, Povenmire, and Marsh would reprise their roles from the series, and that David Errigo Jr. would reprise his role as Ferb from Milo Murphy's Law, replacing original voice actor Thomas Brodie-Sangster. In May 2020, Povenmire revealed that Bowen would make a cameo as Trucker Ted, reprising his role from Milo Murphy's Law. On July 2, 2020, it was announced that Ali Wong, April Winchell, Wayne Brady, Diedrich Bader, and Thomas Middleditch joined the cast in roles created for the film. With the release of the film's trailer on August 5, 2020, it was revealed that John Viener would reprise his role as Norm from the series. On August 20, 2020, Bill Farmer and Tiffany Haddish were announced to be part of the cast, while Thomas Sanders joined the cast the following week. "Weird Al" Yankovic was originally set to reprise his role as Milo Murphy from Milo Murphy's Law, but his cameo was ultimately cut from the final film. However, Yankovic still appears in the film as Shirt Cannon Guy. Similarly, Jack McBrayer was set to reprise his role as Irving from the series, but his scene was deleted from the film due to time issues.

Due to the COVID-19 pandemic, many cast members had to record their lines from their homes. On June 14, 2020, Martella revealed that he had finished recording his lines. After recording their lines, voice actors sent their dialogue to the film's editors.

Animation 
The film's animation was produced by three animation studios: Snipple Animation in the Philippines, Yearim Productions in South Korea and Synergy Animation Studios in Mainland China. Due to Disney Television Animation closing in response to the COVID-19 pandemic, Povenmire did additional animation fixing personally from his home. On May 28, 2020, Povenmire and Marsh said that the film's production wasn't hindered by the temporary closure, since animators "always spend a lot of time drawing at home. So most of them have a pretty full setup and most of them already have the technology to be able to link up". However, on August 24, 2020, they did say that they had to "keep moving things around", having to transfer in-between animation work between several overseas studios due to each studio being closed in response to the pandemic while still working on animation for the film.

Music 

The soundtrack album was released by Walt Disney Records the same day as the film's premiere on August 28, 2020. It features 11 original songs, the songs "Space Adventure" from Phineas and Ferb and "Chop Away at My Heart" from Milo Murphy's Law (which are briefly heard as gags in the film), and four cues from the film score composed by Jacob. Two songs, "Such a Beautiful Day", written by Povenmire and Kirkpatrick, and sung by Candace, was released. and "We're Back", written by Povenmire and Marsh, and sung by Phineas, Candace, and Doofenshmirtz, were released as singles.

Release 
Phineas and Ferb The Movie: Candace Against the Universe was released on August 28, 2020, exclusively on Disney+.

A day earlier, on August 27, 2020, the film premiered exclusively to D23 Gold Members.

Marketing 
On July 5, 2020, the film appeared as a part of the Comic-Con@Home programme. It was hosted by Michael Schneider and featured appearances from director Bob Bowen, executive producers and stars Dan Povenmire and Jeff "Swampy" Marsh, and stars Ashley Tisdale, Vincent Martella, Dee Bradley Baker, and Maulik Pancholy. The panel discussed the film and its production, and the impact of the original series.

On August 5, 2020, the film's trailer was officially released.

On August 12, 2020, Tisdale, Martella, David Errigo Jr., Pancholy, Povenmire, Marsh, Bobby Gaylor, and Caroline Rhea attended a virtual table reading. Here, they gave a special look at the film's opening scene; Tisdale, Martella, Errigo Jr, Pancholy, Povenmire, Gaylor, and Rhea acted as their characters, whilst Marsh read the screen directions.

On August 26, 2020, Martella, Pancholy, Baker, and Alyson Stoner took a BuzzFeed Celeb Quiz to discover which Phineas and Ferb character they are. The results were:
 Martella is Phineas Flynn.
 Pancholy is also Phineas Flynn.
 Baker is Candace Flynn.
 Stoner is Dr. Heinz Doofenshmirtz.

For the final 10 days before the film's release, Povenmire took to TikTok as Doofenshmirtz in a series of videos entitled "Doofenshmirtz Says What You Tell Him". In each video (except the first, which is an introduction), Povenmire acts out something he is told to do by TikTok users. The requests are:
 Re-enacting the line "It's over, Anakin. I have the high ground!" from Star Wars: Episode III – Revenge of the Sith.
 Singing "Old Town Road" by Lil Nas X and Billy Ray Cyrus.
 Singing "Never Gonna Give You Up" by Rick Astley.
 Singing the theme song to Milo Murphy's Law. Instead of singing it, Povenmire replies, "Oh, boy, can I?".
 Singing "Secret Tunnel" from Avatar: The Last Airbender. Featuring Baker, who sang the song in the series.
 Re-enacting the line "I am inevitable!" from Avengers: Endgame.
 Singing "S.I.M.P. (Squirrels in My Pants)" from Phineas and Ferb.
 Singing "There's a Platypus Controlling Me" from Phineas and Ferb.
 Singing a Phineas and Ferb parody of "You'll Be Back" by Lin-Manuel Miranda from Hamilton.

Reception

Audience viewership 
According to ScreenEngine/ASI, Phineas and Ferb the Movie: Candace Against the Universe was the 5th-most-watched straight-to-streaming title of 2020, as of November 2020.

Critical response
On Metacritic, the film has a weighted average score of 77 out of 100, based on six critics, indicating "generally favorable reviews."

Petrana Radulovic of Polygon praised the humor of the film, and complimented the development of Candace, writing, "Candace Against the Universe does everything Phineas and Ferb does and then some. It’s a natural evolution of the show for Disney Plus, relishing in the series’ perfectly timed humor, updating reference points for the fun of it, and adding an emotional layer that resonates." Jen Chaney of Vulture also gave the film a positive review, calling it a "kid- and grown-up-friendly work of cartoon comedy that’s as consistently delightful and clever as the series always was." Dan Koi of Slate noted the original series' multi-generational appeal, and praised the film's focus on Candace, saying, "These zany heroes never grow up, but their new movie is perfect for an audience that has."

Jennifer Green of Common Sense Media rated the movie 4 out of 5 stars, stating, "Phineas and Ferb the Movie: Candace Against the Universe is another series adventure for all ages. There are positive messages about family, friendship, teamwork, and courage as well as valuing one's own worth. Scientific knowledge and innovation not only provide the usual doses of fun for the stepbrothers and their gang, but also save Candace and Vanessa when they're abducted by aliens. Even Dr. Doofenshmirtz is on the kids' side this time. Kids could be drawn to more Phineas and Ferb episodes and even merchandising after watching this movie." David Ehrlich of IndieWire gave the film a "B" grade, saying, "The Disney+ Phineas and Ferb movie reeks of content for content's sake, but it's still smart, funny, and full of life." Gwen Ihnat of The A.V. Club gave the film a "B" grade and reviewed it positively, despite noting some flaws, writing, "Candace Against the Universe is the high bar that Phineas and Ferb continually set for itself over the course of those hundred-plus episodes [...] That said, after a five-year absence, even an average Phineas and Ferb movie is a welcome one [...] Tisdale has been killing it with her portrayal of Candace for years, so a chance for her character to take center stage and prove that she’s just as cool as Phineas and Ferb is long overdue."

Awards and nominations

Potential sequel 
On August 20, 2020, Povenmire and Marsh revealed that there have been talks for a potential third Phineas and Ferb film.

References

External links 

 
 

2020s American animated films
2020s children's adventure films
2020s children's animated films
2020 animated films
2020 films
American children's animated action films
American children's animated adventure films
American children's animated comic science fiction films
American children's animated science fantasy films
American children's animated musical films
American flash animated films
American musical comedy films
Animated films about children
Animated films about extraterrestrial life
Animated films based on animated series
Disney+ original films
Disney Television Animation films
2020s English-language films
Films set on fictional planets
Candace Against the Universe